David Arthur Russell Howell, Baron Howell of Guildford,  (born 18 January 1936) is a British Conservative Party politician, journalist, and economic consultant. Having been successively Secretary of State for Energy and then for Transport under Margaret Thatcher, Howell has more recently been a Minister of State in the Foreign Office from the election in 2010 until the reshuffle of 2012. He has served as Chair of the House of Lords International Relations Committee since May 2016. Along with William Hague, Sir George Young and Kenneth Clarke, he is one of the few Cabinet ministers from the 1979–97 governments who continued to hold high office in the party, being its deputy leader in the House of Lords until 2010. His daughter, Frances, was married to the former Chancellor of the Exchequer, George Osborne.

Early life
Howell was educated at Eton College, before entering King's College, Cambridge, where he graduated Bachelor of Arts in 1959 with 1st Class honours  in Economics. He proceeded to the degree of Master of Arts in 1963. He went to work in HM Treasury joining the Treasury Economic Section from 1959 to 1960.  In 1960 he wrote the book Principles to Practice, published jointly, and spent four years as a journalist, leader writer and special correspondent on The Daily Telegraph.  He succeeded Geoffrey Howe as editor of Crossbow (the journal of the Bow Group) from 1962 to 1964 before he unsuccessfully contested the constituency of Dudley in the 1964 general election.

Political career
Two years later, in 1966, he was elected MP for the safe seat of Guildford in Surrey, for the Conservative Party, a seat he held until retiring at the 1997 general election.  On 6 June 1997 he was made a life peer as Baron Howell of Guildford, of Penton Mewsey, in the County of Hampshire.

When Margaret Thatcher was elected in 1979, she made Howell her first Secretary of State for Energy and then moved him to Transport in the reshuffle of September 1981 and until 1983. His time at the Ministry of Transport saw the commissioning and publication of the highly controversial Serpell Report into Britain's Railways. The report which emerged included proposals which would have greatly reduced the rail network in Britain and met with an extremely hostile reaction. Although these proposals were not pursued the episode caused considerable political problems for the Government and contributed to Thatcher dropping Howell from the Cabinet.

Howell wrote the book Freedom and Capital, published 1981. In 1979 he was also sworn into the Privy Council. He then wrote the book Blind Victory: a study in income, wealth and power, published 1986. In 1987 he became chairman of the Select committee on Foreign Affairs. He was president of the British Institute of Energy Economics from 2005 to 2014 and has been chairman of the Windsor Energy Group since 2003.

In the House of Lords, he was Deputy Leader of the Opposition from 2005 to 2010.  On the election of the Coalition government he was quickly recommended to Foreign Secretary by the Prime Minister as an enthusiastic advocate of HS2, the only conservative in the government with the relevant ministerial experience. In the September 2012 reshuffle, having served two years as initially agreed, he was asked by the Prime Minister to stand down to provide a Foreign Office place for Baroness Warsi. Howell was Opposition Spokesperson for Foreign and Commonwealth Affairs from 2000 to 2010. He is now Chairman of the new House of Lords International relations Committee. Lord Howell is also Chairman of The Commonwealth Societies Association.

From the election of May 2010 until the reshuffle of 2012, Lord Howell served as Minister of State in the Foreign Office in David Cameron's government, under William Hague as Foreign Secretary.  From September 2012 to April 2013, he was personal adviser to the Foreign Secretary on Energy and Resource Security. Lord Howell has never lobbied on behalf of the IAEA or performed any role related to it at any time. He had nothing to do with the State Visit of the Chinese Chairman or with the deal to build a nuclear power station. He has, however, described the French/Chinese nuclear Hinkley Point C deal as 'one of the worst deals ever for the British consumer'.(FDI).

In November 2012, Greenpeace released secret film of an interview with Lord Howell about the advantages of natural gas over wind power, in which he said that David Cameron "is not familiar with these issues, doesn't understand them", but that George Osborne, his son-in-law, "is of course getting this message and is putting pressure on".

In May 2013, he was appointed president of the Energy Industries Council. In July 2013, he said, in a Lords' discussion on fracking, "there are large, uninhabited and desolate areas, certainly in parts of the north-east, where there is plenty of room for fracking, well away from anybody's residence, and where it could be conducted without any threat to the rural environment". There was much adverse reaction.

Ministerial career

Arms

References

Bibliography 
 Charles Mosley, editor, Burke's Peerage, Baronetage & Knightage, 107th edition, 3 volumes (Wilmington, Delaware, U.S.A.: Burke's Peerage (Genealogical Books) Ltd, 2003), volume 1, pages 51 and 456.
 Charles Mosley, Burke's Peerage and Baronetage, 107th edition, volume 2, page 1989.

External links
 
 
 

|-

|-

1936 births
Alumni of King's College, Cambridge
British Secretaries of State
Conservative Party (UK) life peers
Conservative Party (UK) MPs for English constituencies
Living people
Members of the Bow Group
Members of the Parliament of the United Kingdom for Guildford
Members of the Privy Council of the United Kingdom
Northern Ireland Office junior ministers
People educated at Eton College
Politics of Guildford
Secretaries of State for Transport (UK)
UK MPs 1966–1970
UK MPs 1970–1974
UK MPs 1974
UK MPs 1974–1979
UK MPs 1979–1983
UK MPs 1983–1987
UK MPs 1987–1992
UK MPs 1992–1997
Life peers created by Elizabeth II